Juan Cruz Ochoa López (born 4 March 1979) is a Spanish former footballer who played as a central defender.

Football career
Ochoa was born in Pamplona, Navarre. After beginning professionally with CD Calahorra, he moved to Deportivo Alavés, appearing once for the latter's first team in the 2001–02 season. He could only play in a further four La Liga games during the following campaign, being mainly registered with the reserves; his debut in the top flight occurred on 25 November 2001, as he played the first half of a 0–1 away loss against Villarreal CF.

For 2004–05, Ochoa signed with CD Numancia, experiencing top-tier relegation in his first year. After a second, in which he also was heavily featured, he moved to another club in Segunda División, Real Murcia, playing 21 matches in his second season in a promotion.

Having signed with the team the previous summer, Ochoa started the 2011–12 campaign in the second level with SD Huesca, being released in the very last day of the winter transfer window. On 20 September, the 33-year-old returned to active and signed for one season with Segunda División B side Orihuela CF.

References

External links

 

1979 births
Living people
Footballers from Pamplona
Spanish footballers
Association football defenders
La Liga players
Segunda División players
Segunda División B players
Tercera División players
Deportivo Alavés B players
Deportivo Alavés players
CD Numancia players
Real Murcia players
SD Huesca footballers
Orihuela CF players
Challenger Pro League players
K.A.S. Eupen players
Spanish expatriate footballers
Expatriate footballers in Belgium
Spanish expatriate sportspeople in Belgium